Marl-Sinsen is the one of three stations in the city of  Marl in the German state of North Rhine-Westphalia. The station is classified as station category 5 and is under the station administration of Münster.

Location 

The station is located on Bahnhofstraße (which is an extension of the Bergstraße/Victoriastraße alignment) at its intersection with Gräwenkolkstraße in the Marl district of Sinsen-Lenkerbeck.

The station is near line kilometre 17.056 on the Wanne-Eickel–Hamburg railway (Wanne-Eickel Hauptbahnhof – Hamburg Hauptbahnhof).

History

It was established between 1880 and 1886 on the Wanne-Eickel–Hamburg railway as a stop for farming settlement (Bauerschaft) of Sinsen. Around 25 years after its incorporation into Marl in 1926, the station was renamed Marl-Sinsen at the beginning of the 1950s.

Between 1914 and 1977, it was possible to change at the station to and from the tramways of the Vestische Kleinbahnen and the Vestische Straßenbahnen.

Operations

Passenger services

The station is served only by regional services of the so-called Haard-Achse network: the RE 2 Rhein-Haard-Express (Münster (Westf) Hbf – Düsseldorf Hbf) and the RE 42 Niers-Haard-Express (Münster (Westf) Hbf – Mönchengladbach Hbf). Both lines are operated by DB Regio AG, Region NRW as part of the Rhein-Haard network.

There is no station building and access to the only existing platform is via a staircase or a lift from the road underpass. Currently, it has a 38 centimetre-high platform and so it too low to give accessibility for the disabled to railway vehicles running there. The Verkehrsverbund Rhein-Ruhr has announced that it was planned to raise the platform to a height of 76 centimetres and to modernise the station facilities by 2023 at the latest as part of the Modernisierungsoffensive 3 (modernisation campaign, MOF 3), which is co-financed by the federal and state governments.

Freight operations

In freight transport, the station is of greater importance as the connecting line to the Auguste Victoria colliery begins from it; this also connects to the neighbouring Marl-Chemiepark Power Station. Until the closure of the mine in 2015, Marl-Sinsen was the transfer station for coal trains that were hauled by the locomotives of the colliery to the Sinsen station and from there over the tracks of the DB. For this purpose, there are extensive railway tracks west of the platform, both to the north (the colliery's transfer station) and to the south (the DB freight yard).

The operation of the traffic of the Quarzwerke Group at Sythen is also handled by Deutsche Bahn at Marl-Sinsen.

References

Railway stations in North Rhine-Westphalia
Railway stations in Germany opened in 1886
Buildings and structures in Recklinghausen (district)